'''David Nicolás Osorno’'’ (died on May 31 1918) was a politician who served as the President of Nicaragua from 1 to 5 August 1889.

Presidents of Nicaragua
Conservative Party (Nicaragua) politicians
Year of birth missing
Year of death missing
19th-century Nicaraguan people